Phyllis Lee Hagmoe Lamphere (February 9, 1922 – November 13, 2018) was an American politician and civic activist. She was a longtime member of the Seattle City Council and was the first woman to lead the National League of Cities.

Early life 
Lamphere was born Phyllis Lee Hagmoe on February 9, 1922, in Seattle, Washington. Her father, Ernest Archibald Hagmoe, initially worked in the local water department although he lost his job due to his alcoholism. Her mother, Minnie Hagmoe, was a public servant who worked a series of jobs throughout the Great Depression with the state welfare office, the Works Progress Administration, the Seattle War Commission, the city's voter registration and license offices and the King County tax department. Lamphere studied at Interlake Grade School and Lincoln High School, before receiving a scholarship to Barnard College in 1939. She received a degree in mathematics from the college in 1943, where she studied under dancer Martha Graham.

Career 
After Barnard, she worked for IBM and Boeing, where she was Director of Women's Activities, before entering politics. Lamphere was active in League of Women Voters and lobbied the Seattle City Council to pass a bill that placed budget decisions under the mayor's authority. She won a seat on the city council in 1967 and remained on the council for 11 years. She helped pass an "Open Housing" law banning discrimination in Seattle in 1968 and lobbied for the building of the West Seattle Bridge.

In 1977, Lamphere became the first nonmayoral and woman president of the National League of Cities and ran for Mayor of Seattle, coming in fourth in the primary.

After leaving the council, Lamphere served as regional director of the Economic Development Administration and was named in 1980 to a team tasked with building the Washington State Convention Center, where the Phyllis Lamphere Gallery was named after her. She also helped the Museum of History & Industry relocate to its present location in South Lake Union, Seattle. She was also a board member of Virginia Mason Medical Center, Museum of History & Industry, and a board member of the Washington State Convention Center from 1982 to 2002.

Personal life 
Lamphere was married five times. She lived at the Horizon House retirement center, where she remained active in civic affairs and mobilized retirees in her 90s. She died on November 13, 2018, at age 96 and was survived by three daughters, five grandchildren and three great-grandchildren.

References 

1922 births
2018 deaths
Barnard College alumni
Seattle City Council members
Boeing people
Activists from Seattle
Politicians from Seattle